Wilma de Faria (17 February 1945 – 15 June 2017) was a Brazilian politician. She served as the governor of the Brazilian state of Rio Grande do Norte from 2003 to 2010, the first woman to hold the position. She was a member of the AVANTE.

Death 
Wilma de Faria died on 15 June 2017, aged 72, at São Lucas Nursing Home, in Natal, due to multiple organ failure. She was also victim of a cancer in the digestive system, diagnosed two years before.

Her corpse was veiled at Our Lady of the Presentation Cathedral and later buried at Morada da Paz Cemetery.

See also
 List of mayors of Natal, Rio Grande do Norte

References 

1945 births
2017 deaths
Governors of Rio Grande do Norte
Mayors of Natal, Rio Grande do Norte
Members of the Chamber of Deputies (Brazil) from Rio Grande do Norte
Women mayors of places in Brazil
First ladies of Rio Grande do Norte
Avante (political party) politicians
Brazilian Socialist Party politicians
Democratic Labour Party (Brazil) politicians
Democratic Social Party politicians
National Renewal Alliance politicians
Deaths from cancer in Rio Grande do Norte
Women state governors of Brazil
People from Mossoró